John Hahn (October 30, 1776 – February 26, 1823) was an American politician from Pennsylvania who served as a member of the U.S. House of Representatives for Pennsylvania's 2nd congressional district from 1815 to 1817.

Biography
John Hahn was born in New Hanover Township, Pennsylvania.  He studied at the University of Pennsylvania School of Medicine, graduating in 1798, and practiced medicine.  Hahn was elected as a Republican to the Fourteenth Congress.  He resumed the practice of medicine and also engaged in agricultural pursuits.  He died in New Hanover Township in 1823, and was interred in Falkner Swamp Graveyard.

Sources

The Political Graveyard

References 

1776 births
1823 deaths
People from Montgomery County, Pennsylvania
Democratic-Republican Party members of the United States House of Representatives from Pennsylvania
Perelman School of Medicine at the University of Pennsylvania alumni